During the Soviet occupation, the religious life in Bessarabia and Northern Bukovina underwent a persecution similar to the one in Russia between the two World Wars. In the first days of occupation, certain population groups welcomed the Soviet power and some of them joined the newly established Soviet nomenklatura, including NKVD, the Soviet political police. The latter has used these locals to find and arrest numerous priests. Other priests were arrested and interrogated by the Soviet NKVD itself, then deported to the interior of the USSR, and killed. Research on this subject is still at an early stage. As of 2007, the Christian Orthodox church has granted  the martyrdom to circa 50 clergymen who died in the first year of Soviet occupation (1940–1941).

In 1940–1941, some churches were sacked, looted, transformed into public or utility buildings, or closed. Taxes were set, which the believers were obliged to pay if they wanted to pray and be allowed to hold the mass. When Romanian authorities returned after June 1941, churches and monasteries were rebuilt and opened again, but persecution resumed in 1944, when Soviet forces reconquered the territory.

The (incomplete) list below contains clergymen of any denomination. Like the majority of the population of the region, most of the people named below were Romanian Christian Orthodox. A person is listed below only if the church has officially used the term martyr in reference to the individual. In doing so, Christian churches have to follow a three-step rule: martyrium materialiter (violent death), martyrium formaliter ex parte tyranni (for the faith on the part of the persecutors), martyrium formaliter ex parte victimae (conscious acceptance of God's will).

Alexandru Baltagă, founder of Bessarabian religious press in Romanian language, member of the Sfatul Țării (1917–1918)
Alexandru Motescu, a Bessarabian Romanian Orthodox priest in the city of Tighina. According to the deposition of several witnesses in face of the Comisia de triere in Buzău in 1941, at the onset of the Soviet occupation of Bessarabia, he was caught by a group of Communist supporters and violently mocked. His tongue and ears were cut, then he was taken to the altar, where he was set on fire, and died in horrible pain.
Artemie Munteanu, abbot of the Noul Neamț Monastery
Gheorghe Munteanu (born April 22, 1909, d. 1940), a Bessarabian Romanian Orthodox priest. In 1931, he graduated from the Faculty of Theology of the University of Iaşi, and was ordained a priest in December 1931, being assigned to the Neruşai parish, Ismail County. On July 1, 1935, he became parish priest of the Regina Maria Church in a suburb of the city of Ismail. He was arrested in the summer of 1940 his hair was cut and his beard was shaved amidst demands that he renounce his faith. When he repeatedly refused, his NKVD tormentors smashed his head on the steps of the Cathedral in Ismail. The people of the city buried him secretly.

See also
 Religion in the Soviet Union
 Soviet anti-religious legislation
 Persecution of Christians in Warsaw Pact countries
 Persecution of Christians in the Soviet Union
 Persecutions of the Catholic Church and Pius XII
 USSR anti-religious campaign (1917–1921)
 USSR anti-religious campaign (1921–1928)
 USSR anti-religious campaign (1928–1941)
 USSR anti-religious campaign (1958–1964)
 USSR anti-religious campaign (1970s–1990)
 Eastern Catholic victims of Soviet persecutions
 Persecution of Muslims in the former USSR
 Persecution of Jehovah's Witnesses in the Soviet Union
 Red Terror

References

Soviet occupation of Bessarabia and Northern Bukovina
Political repression in the Soviet Union
Persecution of Christians in the Eastern Bloc
Soviet World War II crimes
History of Christianity in Romania
History of religion in Moldova
Moldavian Soviet Socialist Republic
History of Budjak
History of Chernivtsi Oblast
Romania in World War II
1940s in Ukraine
History of religion in Ukraine
1940 in Christianity
1941 in Christianity
Anti-religious campaign in the Soviet Union
Persecution by atheist states
Anti-Christian sentiment in Europe
Religious persecution by communists